The James Mitchell School is a historic school building at 2410 South Battery Street in Little Rock, Arkansas.  The oldest portion of the building is a four-room structure designed by Charles L. Thompson and built in 1908.  It was enlarged several times, notably by Thompson in 1910 (adding four rooms), and Thomas Harding, Jr. in 1915 (again adding four rooms), and 1952.  Harding's addition gave the building its prominent Classical Revival entrance portico.  The school property includes two outbuildings that also houses classrooms.  The school was originally a segregated facility, serving only white students, but the end of segregation (achieved in Little Rock in the early 1970s) transformed the school into one that served its predominantly black neighborhood.  It was closed in 2005.

The building was listed on the National Register of Historic Places in 2009.  In 2017, the Charter Authorizing Panel of the Arkansas Department of Education approved a proposal to open a K-5 charter school, ScholarMade Achievement Place, in the Mitchell building, targeting an opening date for the 2018–2019 school year.

See also
National Register of Historic Places listings in Little Rock, Arkansas

References

School buildings on the National Register of Historic Places in Arkansas
Neoclassical architecture in Arkansas
Prairie School architecture in Arkansas
School buildings completed in 1908
Education in Little Rock, Arkansas
National Register of Historic Places in Little Rock, Arkansas
Historic district contributing properties in Arkansas
1908 establishments in Arkansas